Sunset Boulevard is a musical with music by Andrew Lloyd Webber, and lyrics and book by Don Black and Christopher Hampton. It is based on the 1950 film of the same title.

The plot revolves around Norma Desmond, a faded star of the silent screen era, living in the past in her decaying mansion on the fabled Los Angeles street. When young screenwriter Joe Gillis accidentally crosses her path, she sees in him an opportunity to make her return to the big screen, with romance and tragedy to follow.

Opening first in London in 1993, the musical has had several long runs internationally and enjoyed extensive tours. However, it has been the subject of several legal battles and ultimately lost money due to its extraordinary running costs.

Background 
From approximately 1952 to 1956, Gloria Swanson worked with actor Richard Stapley (aka Richard Wyler) and cabaret singer and pianist Dickson Hughes on a musical adaptation originally entitled Starring Norma Desmond, then Boulevard! It ended on a happier note than the film, with Norma allowing Joe to leave and pursue a happy ending with Betty. Rights holder Paramount Pictures originally had given Swanson verbal permission to proceed with the musical, but there had been no formal legal arrangement. On 20 February 1957, Paramount executive Russell Holman wrote to Swanson asking her to cease work on the project because "it would be damaging for the property to be offered to the entertainment public in another form as a stage musical." In 1994, Hughes incorporated material from the production into Swanson on Sunset, based on his and Stapley's experiences in writing Boulevard!. A recording of the entire score, which had been housed in the Gloria Swanson archives at the University of Texas, was released on CD in 2008.

In the early 1960s, Stephen Sondheim outlined a musical stage adaptation and went so far as to compose the first scene with librettist Burt Shevelove. A chance encounter with Billy Wilder at a cocktail party gave Sondheim the opportunity to introduce himself and ask the original film's co-screenwriter and director his opinion of the project (which was to star Jeanette MacDonald). "You can't write a musical about Sunset Boulevard," Wilder responded, "it has to be an opera. After all, it's about a dethroned queen". Sondheim immediately aborted his plans. A few years later, when he was invited by Hal Prince to write the score for a film remake starring Angela Lansbury as a fading musical comedian rather than a silent film star, Sondheim declined, citing his conversation with Wilder.

When Lloyd Webber saw the film in the early 1970s, he was inspired to write what he pictured as the title song for a theatrical adaptation, fragments of which he instead incorporated into Gumshoe. In 1976, after a conversation with Hal Prince, who had the theatrical rights to Sunset, Lloyd Webber wrote "an idea for the moment when Norma Desmond returns to Paramount Studios"; Lloyd Webber did no further work on the play until after 1989's Aspects of Love. At that point, Lloyd Webber "felt it was the subject [he] had to compose next", though by February 1990 he had announced plans to turn Really Useful Group private so he could "make movies rather than musicals."

In 1991, Lloyd Webber asked Amy Powers, a lawyer from New York who co-wrote the lyrics for the musical Cinderella: A Musical, to write the lyrics for Sunset Boulevard. Don Black was later brought in to work with Powers; the two wrote the version that was performed in 1991 at Lloyd Webber's Sydmonton Festival.  This original version starred Ria Jones as Norma, and Michael Ball as Joe Gillis, directed by Andrew MacBean. While a complete story, it was still in the experimental stage and not ready for potential producers. A revised version, written by Black and Christopher Hampton had a complete performance at the 1992 Sydmonton Festival, now with Patti LuPone playing Norma, and Kevin Anderson as Joe Gillis, again. directed by Andrew MacBean. This "met with great success". Lloyd Webber borrowed several of the tunes from his 1986 mini-musical Cricket, written with Tim Rice, which had been performed at Windsor Castle and later at the 1986 Sydmonton Festival.

Synopsis

Act I

The place: A mansion on Sunset Boulevard, Los Angeles, 5 a.m. A homicide has been reported. Joe Gillis sets the scene ("Prologue"), noting that "an old-time movie star is involved / Maybe the biggest star of all", and that, if you want to know the "real facts", "you've come to the right party."

Flashback to... Hollywood, 1949 - where a down-on-his-luck screenwriter, Joe Gillis, is trying to hustle up some work at Paramount Studios ("Let's Have Lunch"). His appointment with a producer goes poorly when the executive rejects both Joe's proposed script and a loan to bring his car payments up to date. Joe does, however, meet Betty Schaefer, a pretty, young script editor who suggests they collaborate to rework one of his earlier screenplays ("Every Movie's a Circus"). As they chat, car repossession agents spot Joe, who quickly escapes.

During the ensuing chase, Joe evades his pursuers by pulling in to the garage of a palatial but dilapidated mansion on Sunset Boulevard. Beckoned inside the house, Joe encounters Norma Desmond ("Surrender"), a star actress of the silent-film era. Taken aback, Joe comments, "You used to be in pictures; you used to be big," to which Norma retorts, "I am big – it's the pictures that got small!" ("With One Look")

The gloomy estate is inhabited only by Norma and Max von Mayerling, her loyal butler and chauffeur. Although decades past her prime and mostly forgotten by the public, Norma is convinced she is as beautiful and popular as ever. Max perpetuates this illusion by shielding her from the realities of life out of the limelight and by writing her letters purportedly from still-devoted fans. Norma informs Joe that she plans to make her comeback with Salome, a script she has written for Cecil B. DeMille to direct with her in the starring role as the teenage biblical temptress ("Salome"). Dubious but sensing opportunity, Joe accepts her offer to work on editing the script. Norma insists that Joe stay in her home while they collaborate on Salome ("The Greatest Star of All").

Joe immediately realizes the script is incoherent, but because Norma won't allow a major rewrite, the revision drags on for months. During this time Joe is virtually imprisoned within the house, but he does break away to fulfill his commitment to Betty. Their working relationship blossoms into a romance that has her reconsidering her engagement to Joe's best friend, Artie Green ("Girl Meets Boy").

Blind to Joe's opportunism, Norma lavishes him with gifts that include a wardrobe makeover and he becomes her kept man ("The Lady's Paying"). She declares her love for him and turns quite possessive ("The Perfect Year"); when he leaves her to attend Artie's New Year's Eve party ("This Time Next Year"), she is distraught and attempts suicide. As a conciliatory gesture, Joe reluctantly returns to work on Salome.

Act II

Joe is now living in luxury at Norma Desmond's mansion, for reasons he bluntly states are mercenary ("Sunset Boulevard"). A cryptic message from Paramount has Norma certain that DeMille is eager to discuss her script ("There's Been A Call"). She drops in on the set of his current film and is greeted warmly by former colleagues and the famed director himself, but he is non-committal about Salome ("As If We Never Said Goodbye"). Meanwhile, Max discovers the studio had called to ask about Norma's Isotta Fraschini, not her screenplay. However, a delusional Norma leaves the lot convinced she'll soon be back in front of the cameras and begins to prepare for the role ("Eternal Youth Is Worth a Little Suffering").

Increasingly paranoid, Norma deduces that Joe and Betty are more than just friends ("Too Much in Love to Care"). She calls Betty to reveal Joe's secret life at the mansion, but he overhears and grabs the phone to tell Betty to come see for herself. Realizing their affair is doomed, Joe brusquely tells her he enjoys being Norma's pet and that she should go back to Artie. Betty departs, confused and brokenhearted, and Joe tells Norma he is leaving her and returning to his hometown of Dayton, Ohio. He also bluntly informs her that Salome is an unfilmable script and her fans have long abandoned her. Furious and grief-stricken, Norma fatally shoots Joe three times as he storms out of the house.

Now completely insane, Norma mistakes the swarms of police and reporters who arrive for studio personnel. Imagining herself on the set of Salome, she slowly descends her grand staircase and utters "And now, Mr. DeMille, I am ready for my close-up."

Major characters
Norma Desmond — Mezzo-Soprano; a faded, eccentric, former silent screen star
Joe Gillis — Baritenor; a struggling young screenwriter
Max von Mayerling – Bass-Baritone; Norma's first husband and butler
Betty Schaefer – Soprano; A budding writer and Joe's love interest
Cecil B. DeMille – Bass; the famous director
Artie Green – Baritenor; Betty's fiancé
Myron Sheldrake – a film producer on the lot
Manfred – an expensive tailor

Characters and original cast

Notable Replacements 
West End (1993-97)
Norma: Betty Buckley, Elaine Paige, Rita Moreno, Petula Clark
Joe: John Barrowman

Broadway (1994-97)
Norma: Betty Buckley, Elaine Paige
Joe: John Barrowman

Additional Notable Performers 

Norma: Liz Callaway, Stefanie Powers, Mazz Murray
Joe: Earl Carpenter, Ramin Karimloo, Jonathan Roxmouth
Artie: Ramin Karimloo

Musical numbers

Act I 
"Overture" / "Prologue" – Joe
"Let's Have Lunch" – Joe, Artie, Sheldrake, Betty, Actors, Actress & Scriptwriters
"Every Movie's A Circus" † – Betty, Joe, Finance Man 1 & Finance Man 2
"Surrender" – Norma
"With One Look" – Norma
"Salome" – Norma & Joe
"The Greatest Star of All" – Max
"Every Movie's a Circus (Reprise)" ∞ † – Artie, Joe, Betty, Barman, Actors, Actress & Waiters
"Girl Meets Boy" – Joe & Betty
"New Ways to Dream" – Norma & Joe
"The Lady's Paying" – Norma, Joe, Manfred & Men's Shop Salesmen
"The Perfect Year" – Norma & Joe
"This Time Next Year" – Joe, Betty, Artie & Ensemble

Act II 
"Entr'acte" – Orchestra
"Sunset Boulevard" – Joe
"There's Been a Call" – Norma & Joe
"As If We Never Said Goodbye" – Norma
"Surrender (Reprise)" – Cecil B. DeMile
"Girl Meets Boy (Reprise)" – Joe & Betty
"Eternal Youth Is Worth a Little Suffering" – Norma, Astrologer & Beauticians
"Too Much in Love to Care" – Betty & Joe
"New Ways to Dream (Reprise)" – Max
"The Final Scene" – Joe, Betty, Norma & Max

† Song added for Los Angeles production

∞ Originally a reprise of "Let's Have Lunch"

Productions

Original London production
The original West End production, directed by Trevor Nunn and choreographed by Bob Avian, with costumes from Anthony Powell, opened on 12 July 1993 at the Adelphi Theatre. The cast featured Patti LuPone as Norma Desmond, Kevin Anderson as Joe Gillis, Meredith Braun as Betty Schaefer, and Daniel Benzali as Norma's ex-husband, Max.

Billy Wilder and his wife Audrey were joined by Nancy Olson, who had played Betty Schaefer in the original film, at the opening night performance. Of it, Wilder observed, "The best thing they did was leave the script alone," and of Patti LuPone he exclaimed, "She's a star from the moment she walks on stage".

Reviews were mixed, according to the Associated Press (AP) review summary. That summary quoted, for example, the review by Michael Kuchwara for the AP: "Some reviewers felt Lloyd Webber took the sting out of a cynical tale. 'Wilder's bitter brew has been diluted,' wrote AP Drama Critic Michael Kuchwara. He added: 'When LuPone is off stage, the show sags.'" Frank Rich wrote "Much of the film's plot, dialogue and horror-movie mood are preserved, not to mention clips used to illustrate those sequences in which the faded silent-film star, Norma Desmond ...and her kept, young screenwriter, Joe Gillis, ... travel by car. The lyricist, Don Black ..., and the playwright, Christopher Hampton ..., smartly tailor their jokes to the original screenplay's style. At times, even Lloyd Webber gets into the Wilder swing. Both acts open with joltingly angry diatribes about Hollywood, part exposition-packed recitative and part song, in which the surprisingly dark, jazz-accented music, the most interesting I've yet encountered from this composer, meshes perfectly with the cynical lyrics. Anderson makes the sardonic Wilder voice an almost physical presence in Sunset Boulevard, but he is too often drowned out by both LuPone's Broadway belt and mechanical efforts of Lloyd Webber and his director, Trevor Nunn, to stamp the proven formulas of Phantom and Les Miz on even an intimate tale. At odd moments, the mammoth set advances like a glacier toward the audience or retreats, or, most dramatically, rises partly up into the flies, actors in tow."

With associate director Andrew MacBean, the show closed for three weeks, re-opening on 19 April 1994, revamped to follow the Los Angeles production, with a second official "opening". The revamped musical had a new song, "Every Movie's a Circus", a new set, and new stars, Betty Buckley and John Barrowman. Anita Louise Combe took over the role of Betty Schaeffer and, as a result of her performance, was invited to play the role in the original Canadian Premiere production in Toronto the following year.  Michael Bauer, who had originally played DeMille, replaced Benzali as Max, a role he played until the end of the London run (and subsequently on the UK tour and in the BBC concert). Buckley and the production garnered rave reviews. David Lister of The Independent, for example wrote: "The show looked an improvement on the one that got decidedly mixed reviews last summer."

Betty Buckley went on to replace Glenn Close as Norma in the second year of the Broadway production. Elaine Paige, who had filled in when Buckley was ill in 1994, took over the part in the West End in May 1995 before joining the Broadway production for the end of its run between 1996 and 1997. Petula Clark filled in for Paige during her holiday in September/October 1995, before taking over the role in January 1996 when Paige departed for the United States.  The last actress to play Norma in London was Rita Moreno, who filled in for a vacationing Clark in September and October 1996. John Barrowman played Joe until 1995, when he was replaced by Alexander Hanson. Graham Bickley played the role for the final year of the London run.

The show closed on 5 April 1997 after 1,530 performances.

Los Angeles production

The American premiere was at the Shubert Theatre in Century City, Los Angeles, California, on 9 December 1993, with Close as Norma and Alan Campbell as Joe. Featured were George Hearn as Max and Judy Kuhn as Betty. Lloyd Webber had reworked both the book and score, tightening the production, better organising the orchestrations, and adding the song "Every Movie's a Circus". This new production was better received by the critics and was an instant success, running for 369 performances. The Los Angeles production also recorded a new cast album that is well regarded. It is also the only unabridged cast recording of the show, since the original London recording was trimmed by over thirty minutes.

A controversy arose with this production after Faye Dunaway was hired to replace Glenn Close. Dunaway went into rehearsals with Rex Smith as Joe and Jon Cypher as Max. Tickets went on sale for Dunaway's engagement but shortly after rehearsals started the producers announced that Dunaway was unable to sing the role to their standards and the production would shut down when Close left. Dunaway "claims that when advance sales slumped, Sir Andrew decided to save money by sending the LA cast of Sunset Boulevard - based on the story of a clapped-out Hollywood actress - to Broadway, where it is due to open in November. " However, the Los Angeles Times reported that "The cancellation came despite advance ticket sales for the Los Angeles production 'way in excess of $4 million,' said Peter Brown, a spokesman for Lloyd Webber."

Dunaway filed a lawsuit claiming her reputation had been damaged by the producer's claims.  Dunaway's lawsuit was settled and the producers paid her a settlement but no other terms of the agreement have ever been disclosed.

Original Broadway production
The musical opened on Broadway at the Minskoff Theatre on 17 November 1994 with Close, Campbell, and Hearn recreating their roles from the Los Angeles production and Alice Ripley joining the cast as Betty. Also in the cast were Alan Oppenheimer as Cecil B. DeMille and Vincent Tumeo making his Broadway debut as Artie Green. The production opened with the second-highest advance in the history of Broadway ticket sales at that time with advance sales of $37.5 million compared to $39 million for Miss Saigon in 1991 and on its second day, it set a single day sales record on Broadway of $1.4 million. It closed on March 22, 1997 after playing 977 performances. Billy Wilder was in attendance on opening night and was coaxed onstage by Close for the curtain call. In a season with only one other musical nominated for Best Musical, the production won several Tony Awards; Glenn Close, with only one other nominee as Best Actress in a musical, won the Tony for Best Performance by an Actress in a Leading Role.

The New York Times theatre critic Vincent Canby commented about the Tony Awards for this year: "Awards don't really tell you much when the competition is feeble or simply non-existent, as was the case the year that Sunset Boulevard won its Tony. Such prizes are for use in advertising and promotion and to impress the folks back home."

Patti LuPone, who initially had been promised the Broadway run, sued Lloyd Webber and received a settlement reported to be $1 million. Frank Rich, in his book The Hot Seat, noted that these lawsuits contributed to Sunset Boulevard setting the record for the most money lost by a theatrical endeavour in the history of the United States.  According to The New York Times, operating costs soared far beyond the budget, and the "Broadway production has earned back, at best, 80% of the initial $13 million". For example, during the week of 2 July 1995, "it cost $731,304 to run Sunset Boulevard, including... advertising fees of $138,352 (which had been budgeted at $40,000 a week)." The road companies also generated large financial losses.  Rich puts the final figure near or above US$20 million lost, making the show what he termed a "flop-hit", as it ran more than two years. The musical sold over a million tickets on Broadway.

Touring productions
The first national US tour in 1996 starring Linda Balgord ended in early 1997 after only a handful of venues due to exorbitant costs involved in transporting the set. Lloyd Webber called in director Susan H. Schulman to design a scaled-down production, with Petula Clark once again in the lead opposite Lewis Cleale as Joe.  This production featured Anthony Powell's Tony Award nominated costumes, a slightly modified libretto by Schulman and Don Black and a new, more tour-friendly set by Derek McLane. The revised production, opening in Pittsburgh about a year after the closing of the original tour in Chicago, went on the road for almost two years, though it avoided the cities covered by the previous tour.

In August 2001, a UK tour commenced in Plymouth starring Faith Brown as Norma, opposite Earl Carpenter as Joe. The production had a completely new set, much simpler than the original London set, although the overall production remained closer to the original staging than the revamped US national tour.  Carpenter left midway through the tour and was replaced by Jeremy Finch, who had previously understudied the role.  The tour finished in late 2002 in Manchester and met with both excellent reviews and respectable ticket sales.

Ria Jones, who originated the role of Norma Desmond in the 1991 Sydmonton Workshop and understudied Glenn Close in the 2016 West End revival, led a new production opening at Leicester's Curve Theatre on 16 September 2017 for a two-week run before embarking on a national tour around the United Kingdom. The tour, directed by Curve artistic by Nikolai Foster, transferred the musical into a Hollywood sound stage setting, designed by Colin Richmond, with acclaimed use of vintage archive film and projections designed by Douglas O'Connell.

International productions
The original Canadian production opened in Toronto on October 15th 1995 with Diahann Carroll in the lead role. Her performance was praised by critics.  It also starred Rex Smith as Joe, Walter Charles as Max and Anita Louise Combe, who had played Betty opposite Betty Buckley as Norma and John Barrowman as Joe in the London production, repeating in this role. Toronto performances ended in August 1996, with the production later moving to Vancouver where it ran from November 1996 to March 1997. A highlights recording of this production was released on CD.

A German production of the musical opened 7 December 1995 at the newly built Rhein-Main Theater in Niedernhausen near Wiesbaden, starring Helen Schneider and Sue Mathys (matinees) as Norma and Uwe Kröger as Joe. A cast recording (with Schneider and Kröger) was released in 1996. The role of Norma was later played by Daniela Ziegler and Christina Grimandi, with Schneider and, for the last few months, Sue Mathys both returning to play the lead. The production closed in May 1998.

In October 1996, the original Australian production of the musical opened at Melbourne's newly restored Regent Theatre. The cast included Debra Byrne as Norma, Hugh Jackman as Joe, and Catherine Porter as Betty. Maria Mercedes starred as the alternate Norma, performing two of the eight shows each week. Amanda Harrison took over the role of Betty for the final months of the show's run. The production ran until 14 June 1997.

A year-long Dutch tour commenced in the Netherlands on 10 October 2008, with Simone Kleinsma and Pia Douwes alternating as Norma and Antonie Kamerling as Joe, using the same modified libretto that was first used in the 2001 UK tour. Kleinsma went on to win the Best Actress Award for the role in the 2009 Dutch Musical Awards and also Best Actress for the Flemish Musical Prizes. An official cast album was released, with Kleinsma appearing on the main album and with a four track bonus CD of Pia Douwes singing Norma's main arias.

The Swedish premiere took place at the Värmlandsoperan in September 2009, to mostly positive reviews. The role of Norma was played by Maria Lundqvist. A second much more elaborate production opened in October 2010, at the Gothenburg Opera House, with Gunilla Backman (who previously understudied the role of Betty in the original German production) starring as Norma.

A South African production starring Angela Kilian as Norma and Jonathan Roxmouth as Joe, was shown at the Pieter Toerien Theatre at Montecasino in Johannesburg from late August 2013 to mid October 2013 and at Theatre on the Bay in Cape Town from late October 2013 until early January 2014.

The Czech production with Hana Fialová and Katarína Hasprová in the role of Norma had its premiere in National Moravian-Silesian Theatre in Ostrava. The premiere took place on 19 February 2015. The show closed in March 2017.

Another German production, starring Katharina Scherer as Norma, Philippe J. Kayser as Joe, Antonia Crames as Betty, and Stephan Vanecek as Max, opened to sold-out seats on 15 September 2017 and had its fourteenth and final performance on 8 October 2017 at the Tuchfabrik in Trier.

The Spanish premiere production opened 27 December 2017 at the Auditorio de Tenerife, directed by Jaime Azpilicueta and starring Paloma San Basilio as Norma Desmond, Gerónimo Rauch as Joe Gillis, Inma Mira as Betty Schaefer, and Gonzalo Montes as Max von Mayerling.

London revivals
An eight-week engagement of a minimalist production, in which the actors used musical instruments, enjoyed a good run at the Watermill Theatre in Newbury over the summer of 2008.  Directed and choreographed by Craig Revel Horwood, the cast featured Kathryn Evans as Norma and Ben Goddard as Joe.  A West End transfer of the Watermill production began on 4 December 2008 prior to an official opening 15 December at the Comedy Theatre, with Evans and Goddard reprising their roles, and Dave Willetts joining the cast as Max. The production received rave reviews and extended its run to September 2009. However, the production closed just after initially planned on 30 May 2009. It had originally been booking until 19 September 2009. There were plans for a UK Tour and also talks of bringing the show to Broadway

Opening on 4 April 2016 English National Opera (ENO) presented a five-week 'semi-staged' run at the London Coliseum. Glenn Close reprised her role as Norma, making her West End debut, along with Michael Xavier as Joe, Siobhan Dillon as Betty and Fred Johanson as Max. Michael Linnit and Michael Grade for Gate Ventures PLC worked with ENO to present the show; Johnny Hon was the executive producer. It was announced on 25 October 2016 that the production will transfer to Broadway at the Palace Theatre in a limited engagement.

2017 Broadway revival
Glenn Close reprised her performance as Norma Desmond in a revival on Broadway. Featuring a 40-piece onstage orchestra and a relatively minimalist set, the production began performances at the Palace Theatre on 2 February 2017 before opening officially on 9 February for a limited run, with tickets on sale through 25 June 2017. The cast featured Michael Xavier as Joe Gillis, Siobhan Dillon as Betty Schaefer, and Fred Johanson as Max von Mayerling, all reprising their roles from the 2016 London ENO production. The 2017 Broadway revival was directed by Lonny Price.

Other productions
In 2004, the first regional production of Sunset Boulevard was staged in the round at the Marriott Theatre in Chicago for a limited period and starred Paula Scrofano as Norma. It was the first and only regional production to be licensed by the Really Useful Group (RUG) for the next six years. However, in the spring of 2010, the leasing rights were finally released to regional companies and numerous productions have been staged around the United States.

The Ogunquit Playhouse production ran from 28 July through 14 August 2010 and starred Stefanie Powers as Norma and Todd Gearhart as Joe. This was the first fully staged production in the U.S. in nearly a decade. The Ogunquit production was directed by Shaun Kerrison with choreography by Tom Kosis, featured costumes by Anthony Powell and an all new set designed exclusively for Ogunquit by Todd Ivins.

The Arvada Center production ran from 14 September to 10 October 2010, in Denver, Colorado, the same city that launched the ill-fated first US tour in 1996. The show starred Ann Crumb as Norma and Kevin Earley as Joe. The production was directed by Rod A. Landsberry.

The Kennedy Center production ran from February 1-8, 2023 in Washington, DC, with Stephanie J. Block starring as Norma, Derek Klena as Joe and Auli'i Cravalho as Betty. The show ran as a limited engagement as part of the Kennedy Center's Broadway Center Stage series.

Concert productions
In April 2004, Petula Clark reprised her role as Norma opposite Michael Ball in a concert production of the show that ran for two nights at the Cork Opera House in Ireland, which was later broadcast on BBC Radio 2. The cast also included Michael Bauer (Max), Emma Williams (Betty), Michael Xavier (Artie) and the BBC Concert Orchestra was conducted by Martin Yates.

Another two-day concert engagement took place in 2004 in Sydney by the Production Company; Judi Connelli starred as Norma, Michael Cormick played Joe and Anthony Warlow was Max. The Production Company staged a slightly more elaborate version of the concert for a week in Melbourne during 2005. Connelli again starred as Norma, and David Campbell took the role of Joe. The State Theatre was sold out for every performance.

Film adaptation
Paramount Pictures and the Relevant Picture Company announced in 2005 that they were developing a film adaptation of the musical. In 2007, The Daily Telegraph reported that actresses considered for the role of Norma Desmond included Close, Paige, Meryl Streep, Liza Minnelli, and Barbra Streisand. In a 2008 interview, Andrew Lloyd Webber said that there were no plans for a film adaptation to be made in the near future, but remained hopeful that one would be made at some point. In 2011, Lloyd Webber indicated that he would have wanted Madonna to star in the film.

In a 2013 interview with Elaine Paige during her BBC Radio 2 show Elaine Paige on Sunday, Lloyd Webber was asked about the progress of the film, to which he replied:

In February 2019, it was announced that Rob Ashford had signed on to direct the film, with Close reprising her role as Norma Desmond and Tom MacRae penning the script, with production slated to begin on October of that year, but was then delayed to the fall of 2020. In an October 2020 interview, Close, along with her confirmation of co-producing the film alongside Lloyd Webber, said that she hoped filming would commence in early 2021, citing the COVID-19 pandemic as the reason for the delay. In May 2021, Close stated in an interview that production was "very, very close" to beginning and that they were "ready to go", while also adding that Lloyd Webber was still working on new music for the film. However, in October 2021, Lloyd Webber announced that production had been stalled, stating, "I wish I could say it's going into production tomorrow morning, but it's not. Paramount has not wanted to go ahead with it. It's not for want of trying. Glenn Close has been absolutely doggedly trying to get it made." On May 2, 2022, at the 2022 Met Gala, Close revealed that "We're getting closer, believe it or not. We're getting closer," without disclosing any additional information.

Awards and nominations

Original London production

Original Broadway production

2008 London revival

2016 London revival

2017 Broadway revival

Notes

References
Ganzl, Kurt. Ganzl's book of the Broadway musical: 75 shows, from H.M.S. Pinafore to Sunset Boulevard. New York: Schirmer Books, 1995. 
Plot and production listing guidetomusicaltheatre.com
Profile of the musical Broadway Musical Home

External links
 
 

Musicals by Andrew Lloyd Webber
Musicals by Don Black (lyricist)
Musicals based on films
1993 musicals
Broadway musicals
West End musicals
Tony Award for Best Musical
Plays set in Los Angeles
Plays set in the 1940s
British musicals
Sung-through musicals
Tony Award-winning musicals